Helicobacter brantae is a bacterium in the Helicobacteraceae family, Campylobacterales order. It is Gram-negative, microaerophilic, spiral to curve-shaped,  being first isolated from the faeces of geese.

References

Further reading

Liu, Dongyou, ed. Molecular detection of foodborne pathogens. CRC Press, 2009. 
Gyles, Carlton L., et al., eds. Pathogenesis of bacterial infections in animals. John Wiley & Sons, 2008.

External links

LPSN
Type strain of Helicobacter brantae at BacDive -  the Bacterial Diversity Metadatabase

Campylobacterota
Bacteria described in 2006